Porphyroglottis is a monotypic genus of flowering plants from the orchid family, Orchidaceae. The sole species is Porphyroglottis maxwelliae, native to Borneo, Malaysia and Sumatra.

See also 
 List of Orchidaceae genera

References 

 Berg Pana, H. 2005. Handbuch der Orchideen-Namen. Dictionary of Orchid Names. Dizionario dei nomi delle orchidee. Ulmer, Stuttgart

External links 

Monotypic Epidendroideae genera
Cymbidieae genera
Orchids of Malaysia
Orchids of Borneo
Orchids of Sumatra
Cymbidiinae